Patrick Edlinger (15 June 1960 – 16 November 2012) was a professional French rock climber.  Edlinger is considered a pioneer and a legend of sport climbing. He was the second-ever climber in history to ascend routes of grade  with Nymphodalle (1979), and grade  with Le Toit (1981).  He was the first-ever climber in history to onsight routes of grade  with Captain crochet (1982), and grade  with La Polka des Ringards (1982).

Early life

Patrick Edlinger was born in 1960 in Dax, Landes, in southwestern France. He was barely a teenager when he began climbing and, after attaining his first job as a truck driver, decided he loved cliffs more than highways.

Career
In 1983 he made the first ascent of Ça Glisse Au Pays des Merveilles at Buoux, one of the first  in France. He won some of the first climbing competitions in history: Sportroccia in 1986, Rock Master and Snowbird in 1988.

He is also known to the world for his films on soloing in the steep, 500m Verdon. "Le Blond" had a smooth and beautiful style of climbing that lent itself to film. He became famous in 1982 after La Vie au bout des doigts, a documentary by Jean-Paul Janssen depicting him free-soloing in Buoux.

Final years and death
After a near-fatal fall in 1995 from a steep-sided cove in southern France, Edlinger suffered a brief cardiac arrest. Following this he retired from the extreme forms of free climbing and co-founded the magazine Roc 'n Wall, which served as a bible to the burgeoning European "free solo" climbing movement. He settled close to Verdon Gorge, where the vacation rental he ran with his Slovakian-born wife Matia, Gîte l'Escales in La Palud-sur-Verdon, became a starting-point for rock climbers. His final years were marked by a long battle against depression and alcoholism, which he described as the "greatest challenge of my life."

Edlinger died at age 52 after falling down stairs at his home. He is survived by his wife, Maťa, and their daughter, Nastia, who was 10 years old at the time. The French minister of sports and youth, Valérie Fourneyron, said of Edlinger, "Patrick was a pioneer in France for free climbing at a high level, a man who had a thirst for the absolute challenge. He refused to compromise and disdained conventions. He dedicated his life to his passion – climbing. He was the first to establish climbing as a true discipline of live art, paving the way for many to climb with respect for nature."

Notable climbs 
The following a summary of his notable ascents:

 8c/5.14b:
 Maginot Line – Volx (FRA) – 1989 – Second ascent of Ben Moon's route (1989)
 Azincourt – Buoux (FRA) – 1989 – Ben Moon's route (1989)
 le Minimum – Buoux (FRA) – 1989 
 Asymptote – Saint-Crépin (FRA) – 1989 – Second ascent of Antoine Le Menestrel's route (1987)
 Are you Ready? – Châteauvert (FRA) – 1988 – First ascent
 8b+/5.14a:
 Les spécialistes – Verdon (FRA) – 1989 – Second ascent of Jean-Baptiste Tribout's route (1987)
 8b/5.13d:
 Les sucettes à l'anis – Cimaï (FRA) – 1988 – First ascent
 8a+/5.13c:
 La Femme Blanche – Céüse (FRA) – 1985
 La Boule – Sainte-Victoire (FRA) – 1984 – First ascent
 8a/5.13b:
 Orange Mécanique – Cimaï (FRA) – 1989 – Free solo ascent
 Sphinx Crack – South Platte, Colorado (USA) – 1985
 Ça glisse au pays des merveilles – Buoux (FRA) – 1983 – First ascent
 7c+/5.13a:
 La Femme Noire (7c/7c+) – Céüse (FRA)
 Fenrir – Verdon (FRA) – 1982 – First ascent
 7c/5.12d:
 Medius – St. Victoire (FRA) – 1981
 La Polka des ringards – Buoux (FRA) – 1980 – On-sight, the world's first-ever  onsight in history.

See also
History of rock climbing
Jerry Moffatt

References

External links
  (Video interview during Trento Film Festival 2009)

French rock climbers
Free soloists
1960 births
2012 deaths
People from Dax, Landes
Sportspeople from Landes (department)